Slinneanachd is a kind of divination formerly practiced in Scotland. The practice is now extinct.

It involved inspecting the shoulderblades of an animal (usually a carcass), and according to one version, one had to eat the flesh of the animal without touching the bone with tooth or nail.

See also
 Scapulimancy
 Oracle Bone

References

Divination
Scottish folklore